Yar Mohammad-e Kharut (also Romanized as Yār Moḩammad-e Kharūţ; also known as Yār Moḩammad-e Kūhī) is a village in Dust Mohammad Rural District, in the Central District of Hirmand County, Sistan and Baluchestan Province, Iran. At the 2006 census, its population was 91, in 19 families.

References 

Populated places in Hirmand County